Michael Troy Gerock is a retired United States Air Force major general who served as the Commander of the Air National Guard Readiness Center from 2020 to 2022. Previously, he was the Director of the Senior Leader Management Office.

References

External links
 

Year of birth missing (living people)
Living people
Place of birth missing (living people)
United States Air Force generals